Oteen Veterans Administration Hospital Historic District is a historic hospital complex and  national historic district located at Asheville, Buncombe County, North Carolina.  The district encompasses 18 contributing buildings and 1 contributing structure associated with the Veterans' Administration hospital at Asheville. They were built between 1924 and 1940, and include white frame Colonial Revival and massive yellow stucco Georgian Revival structures. Notable buildings include the Administration Building (1928), Wards A and B (1925), Wards C and D (1930), Wards E and F (1932), Kitchen (1926) and Dining Hall (1930), Officers' Quarters (1927), and Nurses Dormitories (1930 and 1932). In 1967, a new Asheville, VA Medical Center complex was built adjacent to the original.

It was listed on the National Register of Historic Places in 1985.

Gallery

References

External links
 

Hospital buildings on the National Register of Historic Places in North Carolina
Historic districts on the National Register of Historic Places in North Carolina
Colonial Revival architecture in North Carolina
Georgian Revival architecture in North Carolina
Buildings and structures in Asheville, North Carolina
National Register of Historic Places in Buncombe County, North Carolina